Anicet-Richard Lavodrama y Ondoma (born 4 July 1963 in Bangui) is a retired professional basketball player from the Central African Republic.

Professional career
Lavodrama played for the Houston Baptist Huskies from 1981 until 1985, and he was selected by the Los Angeles Clippers in the 3rd round of the 1985 NBA Draft. Lavodrama also played in 345 games in the top-tier level league in Spain, the Liga ACB, between 1985 and 1998 (except for the 1987–88 season, after his club, OAR Ferrol, were relegated).

Central African Republic national team
Lavodrama competed at the 1988 Summer Olympics with the Central African Republic national basketball team. Appearing in each of the seven games, Lavodrama scored 30 points twice, and also had a double-double in 4 of the six games.

References

1963 births
Living people
Central African Republic expatriate basketball people in Spain
Central African Republic men's basketball players
Central African Republic expatriate basketball people in the United States
Houston Christian Huskies men's basketball players
Olympic basketball players of the Central African Republic
Basketball players at the 1988 Summer Olympics
Los Angeles Clippers draft picks
Liga ACB players
CB Valladolid players
Joventut Badalona players
People from Bangui